The 1995–1996 session was a former session of the California State Legislature. The session first convened on December 5, 1994 and adjourned sine die on November 30, 1996. As of 2023, this is the last session in which Republicans controlled a legislative chamber in California.

Major events

Vacancies and special elections 
 July 8, 1994: Republican state senator Frank Hill (29th–Whittier) resigned after being convicted of extortion, money laundering, and conspiracy in a corruption scandal.
 January 2, 1995: Republican state senator Marian Bergeson (35th–Newport Beach) resigned after being elected to the Orange County Board of Supervisors. 
 January 23, 1995: Republican assemblyman Dick Mountjoy (59th–Arcadia) is expelled from the State Assembly. Mountjoy had been simultaneously elected in the November elections to the state assembly and the state senate, the latter in a special election for the 29th State Senate district to replace Hill. Mountjoy was first sworn into the Assembly in December intending to elect a Republican speaker, but was expelled for attempting to hold both offices. He was sworn into the State Senate on January 24.
 May 11, 1995: Republican assemblyman Ross Johnson (72nd–Placentia) is sworn into office after winning the May 9 special election for the 35th State Senate district to replace Bergeson. Earlier, he had moved his residence to Irvine to run in the district.
 May 18, 1995: Republican Gary Miller of Diamond Bar is sworn into office after Independent Paul Horcher (60th–Diamond Bar) was recalled on May 16.
 June 7, 1995: Republican Bob Margett of Arcadia is sworn into office after winning the June 6 special election for the 59th State Assembly district to replace Mountjoy. 
 August 22, 1995: A recall election against Democratic assemblyman Michael Machado (17th–Linden) failed, and Machado remained in office.
 September 13, 1995: Republican Dick Ackerman of Fullerton is sworn into office after winning the September 12 special election for the 72nd State Assembly district to replace Johnson.
 November 29, 1995: Republican Scott Baugh of Huntington Beach is sworn into office after Republican Doris Allen (67th–Cypress) was recalled on November 28.
 December 14, 1995: Republican state senator Tom Campbell (11th–Campbell) and Democratic assemblyman Willie Brown (13th–San Francisco) resigned. Campbell was elected to the United States House of Representatives in a December 12 special election for California's 15th congressional district, while Brown was elected to become Mayor of San Francisco.
 March 28, 1996: Democratic assemblyman Byron Sher (21st–Palo Alto) is sworn into office after winning the March 26 special election for the 11th State Senate district to replace Campbell. Democrat Carole Migden of San Francisco is sworn into office after winning the March 26 special election for the 13th State Assembly district to replace Brown.
 April 15, 1996: Democratic assemblywoman Juanita Millender-McDonald (55th–Carson) resigned after being elected to the United States House of Representatives in a March 26 special election for California's 37th congressional district.

Leadership changes 
 December 5, 1994 – January 23, 1995: The Assembly had no speaker after the chamber deadlocked on a 40–40 vote between Democrat Willie Brown (13th–San Francisco) and Republican Jim Brulte (63rd–Rancho Cucamonga), with Paul Horcher (60th–Diamond Bar) voting with the Democrats. On January 24, Brown was elected speaker on a 40–39 vote after expelling Dick Mountjoy (see above).
 January 2, 1995: Democrat Gray Davis is sworn in as Lieutenant Governor (who is also President of the State Senate) to succeed fellow Democrat Leo T. McCarthy.
 June 5, 1995: Republican assemblywoman Doris Allen (67th–Cypress) is elected speaker with the support of Democrats to succeed Brown. Brown remained Democratic leader in the State Assembly.
 August 21, 1995: Assemblyman Curt Pringle (68th–Garden Grove) is elected Republican leader after Jim Brulte (63rd–Rancho Cucamonga) resigned the position on August 18.
 August 24, 1995: Republican state senator Kenneth L. Maddy (14th–Fresno) is ousted from the position of Republican state senate leader by Rob Hurtt (34th–Garden Grove).
 September 14, 1995: Republican assemblyman Brian Setencich (30th–Fresno) is elected speaker with the support of Democrats and Allen to succeed Allen.
 December 18, 1995: Assemblyman Richard Katz (39th–Sylmar) is elected Democratic leader after Willie Brown (13th–San Francisco) resigned from the State Assembly.
 January 4, 1996: Republican assemblyman Brian Setencich (30th–Fresno) is ousted from the speakership by fellow Republican Curt Pringle (68th–Garden Grove).

Party changes 
 December 5, 1994: Assemblyman Paul Horcher (60th–Diamond Bar) leaves the Republican Party to become an Independent on the first day of the legislative session.
 December 5, 1995: Assemblyman Dominic L. Cortese (23rd–San Jose) leaves the Democratic Party for the Reform Party.

Senate

Officers

Members

Assembly

Officers

Members

See also
 List of California state legislatures

References

External links 
 California State Senate
 California State Assembly

1995-1996
1995 in California
1996 in California
California
California